Island of the Dead is a 2000 Canadian horror film written by Peter Koper and directed by Tim Southam. Malcolm McDowell stars with Talisa Soto and Bruce Ramsay.

Plot
The story centers around a group of people that arrive at Hart Island, which has recently been purchased by real estate tycoon Rupert King to build what he calls Hope City, supposedly to help the poor and homeless of the city. The only problem is that the City of New York has been burying their unknown and unclaimed dead there since 1869. The group of people include King along with his personal assistant, a New York cop looking for a missing girl's body, and some employees from the Department of Corrections with inmates used to bury the unknown dead.

Initially, the personal assistant goes missing after being attacked by what appears to be a swarm of aggressive flies.  Later, he's found dead and badly decomposed. Large maggots feed on the corpse.  The flies continue to attack, picking off the party one by one.  When the group realizes the danger, they desperately try to escape.

Cast
Malcolm McDowell - Rupert King
Talisa Soto - Melissa O'Keefe
Bruce Ramsay - Tony Matos
Kent McQuaid - James Neely
Mos Def - Robbie J
Paul Hopkins - Rodger Mackloe
Tyrone Benskin - Dwight Truman
Michel Perron - Captain Chanon

External links

2000 films
English-language Canadian films
2000 horror films
Canadian natural horror films
Films shot in Montreal
Films with screenplays by Peter Koper
Films set in the Bronx
2000s English-language films
2000s Canadian films